Nils Gustav von Heidenstam (1822 – 2 June 1887) was a Swedish engineer born in Blekinge. He was the chief engineer of the Swedish Royal Coast Guard.

Life
He was the son of Werther Werner von Heidenstam (16 October 1763 – 1852) and father of Verner von Heidenstam (1859–1940), poet, novelist and laureate of the Nobel Prize in Literature in 1916.

The mid-19th century was a period of intensive lighthouse-building. The work to cover Sweden's coasts with lighthouses was led by lighthouse engineer Gustav von Heidenstam at the Swedish Board of Pilotage. He designed the type of lighthouse of which Pater Noster is an example, which is often called 'Heidenstammare'. Of a total of eleven lighthouses of this type, ten still remain.

When Heidenstam created the lighthouse Pater Noster, he got his inspiration by studying the English lighthouse Maple Sound in the mouth of the Thames.

References

Swedish engineers
1822 births
1887 deaths
Lighthouse builders
People from Blekinge
Suicides in Sweden
1880s suicides